Ohinemuri County was one of the counties of New Zealand of the North Island.

The Ohinemuri County Council first met on 17 November 1885. It was formed from a portion of Thames County. A 1919 petition resulted in loss of the western part of the area to a new Hauraki Plains County in 1920.

The county was abolished through the 1989 local government reforms.

The population was 1,516 in 1891, 3,056 in 1945 and 5,579 in 1986.

The 1911 Italianate county offices at 41 Belmont Road, Paeroa, were used by the county until 1986. They are now used by Hauraki Māori Trust Board and protected by an A Category listing in Hauraki District Plan.

See also 
 List of former territorial authorities in New Zealand § Counties

References

External links 
Te Aroha News report of first meeting

Counties of New Zealand
1885 establishments in New Zealand
1989 disestablishments in New Zealand